Bori is a village in Jintur taluka of Parbhani district in Maharashtra state of India.

Demography
Bori has total 2534 families residing. The Bori village has population of 13,438 of which 6,919 are males while 6,519 are females as per Population Census 2011. It is the largest gram panchayat of Parbhani district with 17 members.

Average Sex Ratio of Bori village is 942 which is higher than Maharashtra state average of 929.

Bori village has lower literacy rate compared to Maharashtra. In 2011, literacy rate of Bori village was 74.93% compared to 82.34% of Maharashtra. In Bori Male literacy stands at 83.35% while female literacy rate was 66.17%.

Schedule Caste (SC) constitutes 15.25% while Schedule Tribe (ST) were 0.83% of total population in Bori village.

Transport
Bori is located  towards north from district headquarters Parbhani, and  towards south from Jintur.

Bori is surrounded by Manwat taluka  towards west, Parbhani taluka towards south, Sailu taluka  towards west, Aundha Nagnath taluka towards east. It is on state highway and has easy connectivity to Parbhani, and Jintur.

Nearest railway stations to Bori include Parbhani , and Manwat road

Governance
Bori comes under Parbhani (Lok Sabha constituency) for Indian general elections and current member of Parliament representing this constituency is Sanjay Haribhau Jadhav of Shiv Sena.

Bori comes under Jintur (Vidhan Sabha constituency) for assembly elections of Maharashtra. Current representative from this constituency in Maharashtra state assembly is Vijay Manikrao Bhamale of Nationalist Congress Party.

As per constitution of India and Panchyati Raaj Act, Bori village is administrated by Sarpanch (Head of Village) who is elected representative of a village. The current representative from this constituency is Mrs. Nirmalabai Shivajiroa Chaudhari of Nationalist Congress Party.

Education

Colleges
Dnyanopasak College of Arts, Commerce, Science, and Technology
Shakuntalabai Bordikar Junior College
Basaveshwar Junior College
Saikrupa Junior College

Schools
Z.P. High School
Z.P. Kanya School
Dyanopasak Vidyalay, Bori
Shakuntala Bordikar Vidyalaya
Saikrupa English School
Saikrupa Primary and Secondary School
New Era English School 
Turabul Haq Urdu H S Bori

See also
 Zari
 Jintur

References

Villages in Parbhani district
Parbhani district